ANQ: A Quarterly Journal of Short Articles, Notes and Reviews is a quarterly academic journal, affiliated to the University of Kentucky, which features short research-based articles about the literature of the English-speaking world and the language of literature.

The journal is published by Taylor and Francis and its editor-in-chief is Sandro Jung.

Previous incarnations of this journal include American Notes and Queries: A Medium for intercommunication for literary men, general readers etc. (Philadelphia, 1888–1892), Searcher: An American Notes and Queries (Philadelphia, 1895–96), American Notes and Queries: A Journal for the Curious (New York, 1941–1950), established by Walter Pilkington and B. Alterslund and American Notes and Queries (New Haven, 1962–1986), edited and published by Lee Ash. The title of the journal was related to other journals started in the 19th century, such as the British Notes and Queries, Canadian Notes & Queries, and Kōtare: New Zealand Notes and Queries.

Abstracting and indexing 
 EBSCOhost Online Research Databases
 Scopus
 MLA International Bibliography

References

External links 
 

Taylor & Francis academic journals
Publications established in 1988
Quarterly journals
English-language journals
Linguistics journals